Laila Johnson-Salami (born 3 December 1996) is Nigerian journalist. She has worked with  Spice TV, Nigeria Info FM, Wazobia Max TV and is now a Correspondent at Arise News. In 2022, she picked up inaugural UNDP/UN Women International Women’s Day Award for Media and Entertainment category and was nominated for the 2022 Gatefield People’s Journalist for Africa Award. She is known for her work in promoting gender equality, youth empowerment, climate action and social inclusion. She is a co-founder of We Rise Initiative, a nonprofit organization focused on women emancipation and a founding member of Feminist Coalition.

Early life and career 
Laila was born in Ibadan, Nigeria to Abayomi Salami (father) and Diana Yeside Johnson (mother). Her grandfather, Lekan Salami was a chief, businessman, sports administrator and politician and her aunty, Caroline Lee Johnson is a British actress. Laila was raised in Nigeria and the UK where she received education and earned a bachelor’s degree in Politics and International Relations at the University of Westminster.

In 2016, she co-founded We Rise Initiative, an NGO focused on liberating women. She returned to Nigeria from the UK in 2017. In 2018, Laila co-hosted a first-of-its-kind show, On the Couch with Falz and Laila where they interviewed presidential aspirants for the 2019 elections. In May 2019, Laila joined Arise News as a co-host of the channel's prime time programme -The Morning Show. She went on to co-host the afternoon programme News Day. Since 2021, Laila has worked as a field correspondent at Arise News reporting on the environment, Healthcare and international affairs. In 2021, Laila produced and presented a wildlife conservation series on Arise News in partnership with international NGO WildAid called Go Wild – a pioneer wildlife series in Nigerian media. In 2022, the UNDP/UN Women International Women’s Day Award committee described her as “A rising star in media and journalism who is changing the narrative around gender equality, youth empowerment, climate action and social inclusion, one conversation at a time.”

She is a Founding Member of the Feminist Coalition, an organisation championing equality for Nigerian women.

Awards 

 2022 UNDP/UN Women International Women’s Day Award for Media and Entertainment
 2022 Gatefield People’s Journalist for Africa Award (Nominee)
 2021 Future Awards Prize for Journalism (Nominee)

References 

Living people
1997 births
Nigerian women journalists
Television personalities from Lagos